The 1941 Wake Forest Demon Deacons football team was an American football team that represented Wake Forest University during the 1941 college football season. In its fifth season under head coach Peahead Walker, the team compiled a 5–5–1 record (4–2–1 against conference opponents), finished seventh in the Southern Conference, and outscored opponents by a total of 218 to 168.

Guard Carl Givler was selected by both the Associated Press and United Press as a first-team player on the 1941 All-Southern Conference football team.

Schedule

References

Wake Forest
Wake Forest Demon Deacons football seasons
Wake Forest Demon Deacons football